Alfrick Pound is a small village in the county of Worcestershire, England, in the United Kingdom.

Location 
Alfrick Pound village is located on the edge of the Malvern Hills area, approximately ten miles west of Worcester near the Suckley Hills and is set in a very rural area.

History and amenities 

It has a very small population of residents and a small number of properties. History tells us that the Alfrick Pound was once an area where stray livestock were held in a pound until the owner was traced or turned up to reclaim them, incurring a small fine in order to do so.

Many of the original houses that stand are half-timbered cottages, an old pub (once called the Wobbly Wheel Inn), a small village school, bakery and even a small police house. None of these are still used for their original purpose and have been modernised and made into private residences though still revealing their old architecture.

A small lane opposite the old Wobbly wheel Inn leads up to the Knapp Nature Reserve.

References

External links 

Alfrick and Lulsley villages community website including Alfrick Pound
photos of Alfrick Pound and surrounding area on geograph

Villages in Worcestershire